†Partula turgida was a species of air-breathing tropical land snail, a terrestrial pulmonate gastropod mollusk in the family Partulidae. This species was endemic to Ra'iātea, French Polynesia. It died out in 1996, and is now extinct. The snail's low rate of movement made it hard to determine the exact date of death but it was confirmed on 31 January.

Partula turgida was being kept alive in captivity, when the population suffered a crash caused by the microsporidian genus Steinhausia. This is the first definitive report of an extinction of a species caused by a parasite.

References

turgida
Extinct gastropods
Taxa named by William Harper Pease
Taxonomy articles created by Polbot
Gastropods described in 1864